The women's 45 kg powerlifting event at the 2020 Summer Paralympics was contested on 26 August at Tokyo International Forum.

Records 
There are twenty powerlifting events, corresponding to ten weight classes each for men and women.

Results

References 

Powerlifting at the 2020 Summer Paralympics
2021 in women's weightlifting